Wilderness at the Smokies is a resort located on Wilderness Territories property in Sevierville, Tennessee. It opened in 2008 as part of the new Bridgemont development, which, along with the resort itself, now includes shopping, dining, and conference facilities.

Phase I of the development included a hotel and outdoor waterpark. The second phase opened in December 2008 and offers a condominium resort and indoor waterpark. The third phase added the Lake Wilderness outdoor waterpark and became available May 2009. Additional facilities include the  "Runaway Canyon" Proslide and Dark Mammoth (family raft ride with water curtains, lighting effects, and sound effects), which opened on November 20, 2009.

In May, 2010, Wilderness Rafting and Catalooche Creek Adventure Golf, at Lake Wilderness, were added.

Indoor waterpark 
Wild WaterDome

Innovative tan-through roof
The Great Wave - 10,000 square foot wave pool
"Storm Chaser"(ProSlide Tornado with lighting and sound effects)
"Smokies Surf Rider" (Flowrider)
"Washout Mountain" interactive multi-level water play structure with 500 gallon (1,900 liter) tipping bucket, 50+ hands-on play-and-spray features including spray cannons, small tipping buckets, etc., and two slides
"Snapping Turtle Activity Pool" indoor/outdoor activity pool with basketball hoops and gigantic floating snake.
"Magnollia Grove" indoor/outdoor hot tub
"Trail Twisters Tube Slides" (two enclosed Proslide tube slides)
"Flying Squirrel Play Area" Toddler area with zero-depth entry, two small side-by-side slides, swing and bounce tree, teeter-totter, tree house that dumps water with a spray feature
"Grizly's Grill" Snack Bar
"Dippin Dots" Stand

Outdoor waterparks
Salamander Springs
.
"The Timber Rattler," a  tube slide.
"The River Otter," a  body slide.
"Lunker's Landing," an interactive water play structure with 3 slides, tipping bucket, and play-and-spray features.
"Catfish Corral" activity pool with three basketball hoops.
"Minnow Marsh," a kiddie zero-depth entry pool.
"Wildflower Lagoon" hot tub.
"Cyote Cove" snack bar.
Back Country arcade and game room.

Lake Wilderness
 in size.
"Washout Wilderness Rapids" wave pool.
"Catalooche Creek Adventure River" (752 ft/230 m lazy river).
"Smoky Mountain Crossing Cabanas" (private poolside cabanas).
"Catalooche Creek Adventure Golf".
"The Wall" waterslide.
Treehouse Springs- A Kids Water Play Area
Cyclone Racers- 4 Lane Racing Mat Slides
Wild Vortex- Drop Pod Looping Waterslide

Wilderness Rafting
In May 2010 Wilderness Rafting was added.

Hotels

River Lodge
A condominium resort with multi-room suites, the hotel is connected to the Lake Wilderness outdoor waterpark and Wild WaterDome indoor water park.

Stone Hill Lodge
The hotel is connected to the Salamander Springs outdoor waterpark and the Sevierville events center. The Stone Hill Lodge has meeting spaces and four-person standard rooms.

References
http://www.wildernessatthesmokies.com

External links
Wilderness At The Smokies Official Website

See also
Wilderness Territory

2008 establishments in Tennessee
Tourist attractions in Sevier County, Tennessee
Water parks in Tennessee
Sevierville, Tennessee